Lake St. George Golf Club is a 27-hole public golf course located in Washago, Ontario, Canada.

History 
Lake St. George began as a 9-hole courses in 1952. It was built by Ed Leeder, who had worked at Toronto Golf Club under legendary Canadian PGA professional George Cumming. In 1974, Robbie Robinson designed and built 9 more holes. Robinson was a former protege of Stanley Thompson. In 2002, Bob Moote designed another 9 holes, creating the modern day 27-hole course.

Courses

West course

South course

North course

See also 
 Golf Canada

References 

Golf clubs and courses in Ontario